Antonio Ramón Villaraigosa (né Villar Jr.; born January 23, 1953) is an American politician who served as the 41st Mayor of Los Angeles from 2005 to 2013. A member of the Democratic Party, Villaraigosa was a national co-chairman of Hillary Clinton's 2008 presidential campaign, a member of President Barack Obama's Transition Economic Advisory Board, and chair of the 2012 Democratic National Convention.

Before becoming mayor, he was a member of the California State Assembly (1994–2000), where he served as the Democratic Majority Leader (1996–98), and the Speaker of the California State Assembly (1998–2000). As Speaker, Villaraigosa was an advocate for working families and helped to write legislation protecting the environment, expanding healthcare access, and increasing funding for public schools.

He ran for mayor in 2001 against Los Angeles City Attorney James Hahn, but lost in the second round of voting. Villaraigosa ran for and was elected to the Los Angeles City Council in 2003. In 2005, he ran for mayor again in a rematch against Hahn and won. During his tenure as mayor, he gained national attention for his work and was featured in Times story on the country's 25 most influential Latinos. He was the first Hispanic in over 130 years to have served as Mayor of Los Angeles. As Mayor, Villaraigosa spearheaded policies to improve student outcomes in the Los Angeles Unified School District, reduce city and highway traffic, and enhance public safety.

Since leaving office in 2013, Villaraigosa has continued to be actively engaged in education, civic engagement, water, immigration, transportation, and economic development issues. He speaks nationally and throughout California on these issues. In November 2016, Villaraigosa announced his candidacy for Governor of California in 2018. In June 2018, Villaraigosa came in third in the blanket primary election, losing to Gavin Newsom and John Cox.

Early life and education
Antonio Ramón Villar Jr. grew up in the City Terrace neighborhood of Los Angeles County's Eastside, and attended both Catholic and public schools. His father immigrated to the United States and became a successful businessman, but lost his wealth during the Great Depression. His young wife left him at this time. His father abandoned their family when he was 5 years old, and at age of 16, a benign tumor in his spinal column briefly paralyzed him from the waist down, curtailing his ability to play sports. His grades plummeted at Cathedral High School, and the next year, he was expelled from the Roman Catholic institution after getting into a fight after a football game. He later graduated from Theodore Roosevelt High School in Boyle Heights after taking adult education classes there at night, and with the help of his English teacher, Herman Katz.

Villar went on to attend East Los Angeles College, a community college, and eventually transferred to University of California, Los Angeles (UCLA), graduating with a Bachelor of Arts degree in history in 1977. At UCLA, he was a leader of MEChA, an organization that seeks to promote Chicano unity and empowerment through political action, but later renounced his association with the group citing its controversial stances on race. At this time, he went by the short form Tony of his given name Antonio. After UCLA, Villar attended the Peoples College of Law (PCL). After completing law school and subsequently failing the California bar exam four times, he became a field representative/organizer with the United Teachers Los Angeles where he organized teachers and was regarded as a gifted advocate. He later served as president of the Los Angeles chapter of the American Civil Liberties Union and the American Federation of Government Employees.
He adopted the blended surname Villaraigosa upon his marriage with Corina Raigosa in 1987.

Early political career

In 1990, Villaraigosa was appointed to the Los Angeles Metropolitan Transportation Board, where he served until 1994. In 1994, he was elected to the California State Assembly. Within his first term, he was selected to serve as Democratic Assembly Whip and Assembly Majority Leader. In 1998, Villaraigosa was chosen by his colleagues to be the Speaker of the Assembly, the first from Los Angeles in 25 years. He left the Assembly in 2000 after serving three two-year terms.

Mayor of Los Angeles

Elections

Villaraigosa ran for election as Mayor of Los Angeles in the 2001 citywide contest, but was defeated by Democrat James Hahn in a run-off election. In 2003, Villaraigosa defeated incumbent Councilman Nick Pacheco to win a seat on the Los Angeles City Council representing the 14th District.

Villaraigosa placed first in the primary for the Los Angeles mayoral election of March 8, 2005, and won the run-off election on May 17, receiving 58.7% of the vote. On July 1, 2005, Villaraigosa was sworn in as the 41st Mayor of Los Angeles. He became the first Latino Mayor of Los Angeles since 1872, when Cristóbal Aguilar (who served from 1866 to 1868 and again from 1870 to 1872) held the office. Attendees to his first inauguration included then Governor Arnold Schwarzenegger; former Governors Gray Davis, Pete Wilson, and Jerry Brown; former Vice President Al Gore, U.S. Secretary of State Warren Christopher, and New York City Mayor Michael Bloomberg.

Villaraigosa was re-elected in 2009, receiving 55.65% of the vote against his most prominent challenger, attorney Walter Moore who won 26.23% of the vote. Villaraigosa drew controversy by refusing to debate any of his opponents before the election.

Tenure

Transportation

One of Villaraigosa's main transportation-related goals was to extend the Purple Line subway down Wilshire Boulevard to Santa Monica. Proponents dubbed the project the "Subway to the Sea." Villaraigosa worked to persuade Congressman Henry Waxman to repeal the ban on subway tunneling in Los Angeles, which occurred in 2006.

On November 4, 2008, Los Angeles County voters passed Measure R, an additional half-cent per dollar sales tax that increased the sales tax rate in Los Angeles County from 8.25% to 8.75% and is projected to generate up to $40 billion over 30 years for transportation. Measure R included funding for the portion of the "Subway to the Sea" between Wilshire/Western and Westwood/VA Hospital; a project known as the Westside Subway Extension. Its passage was credited in large part to Villaraigosa, who lobbied the Metropolitan Transportation Agency and County Board of Supervisors to place it on the November ballot, and helped organize the fundraising efforts.

Working with Wendy Greuel, then Chair of the City Council's Transportation Committee, Villaraigosa issued an executive directive aimed at banning road construction during rush hour in traffic-plagued Los Angeles, and established anti-gridlock zones and launched Tiger Teams to improve traffic flow during peak rush hour times. Villaraigosa even publicly pledged to take the subway to work one day a month, as reported by the Los Angeles Times. This, however, proved impossible for him.

In February 2010, Villaraigosa traveled to Washington, D.C. in order to promote a "Ten/Thirty" plan that requests an $8.8 billion bridge loan to augment the $5.8 billion expected from Measure R tax revenues. Proceeds would accelerate the construction of 12 mass transit projects. The loan would be repaid with continuing income from Measure R funds. Villaraigosa's 30/10 plan eventually morphed into the America Fast Forward program and was passed by Congress.

On Sunday July 18, 2010, Villaraigosa fell from his bicycle after being cut off by a taxi driver; Villaraigosa suffered a broken elbow in the fall, and the taxi driver fled the scene. The accident converted Villaraigosa into "a new champion of cyclists' rights", when he declared a bicycle safety summit, and announced that he would push for the passage of a "3 foot passing rule" in California. The two-hour-long summit meeting, held Monday, August 16, 2010, was criticized for not including input from Los Angeles' Bicycle Advisory Committee, which has held a number of Bicycle Summit meetings. Subsequent to the adoption of the plan, Villaraigosa issued an executive directive that mandated the construction of 40 miles of bikeways each year and requires city agencies to include bicycle-friendly features in their programs and expand public education and training campaigns.

Public safety
As mayor, Villaraigosa was a member of the Mayors Against Illegal Guns Coalition, a national organization of Mayors whose goal is to increase gun control. While mayor, Villaraigosa pursued an agenda of making Los Angeles the safest big city in America.

Villaraigosa proposed a Homeland Security and Emergency Preparedness initiative, which would add certain units to the Los Angeles Police and Fire Departments and reorganize some of the current practices. Villaraigosa also creaTed the Homeland Security Advisors, a group of approximately 40 leaders. The panel includes Police Chief William Bratton, former L.A. FBI chief Ron Iden, former Mayor Richard Riordan, Los Angeles County Sheriff Lee Baca and former District Attorney Ira Reiner. It will be co-chaired by his Deputy Mayor for Homeland Security and Public Safety Arif Alikhan. The panel planned for such issues as counter-terrorism measures, evacuation planning and emergency preparedness.

Villaraigosa vowed to hire 1,000 new police officers. On March 6, 2009, Mayor Villaraigosa and Police Chief Bratton announced that the L.A.P.D. had expanded to its largest force in city history. On May 14, 2009, City Council approved an LAPD/LAFD hiring freeze. In a television advertisement paid for by the Villaraigosa campaign, Chief Bratton stated that "Crime is down to levels of the 1950s." 24 hours before the March 3 election, Villaraigosa and Bratton reannounced a statement from the Mayor's Office that the "citywide crime-rate drop to the lowest level since 1956, the total number of homicides fall[ing] to a 38-year low. Gang homicides were down more than 24 percent in 2008." However, former Chief of Police Daryl Gates argued against this statistic, citing a trend toward lengthier prison sentences for career criminals as the reason for the change. In fact, crime fell by 43 percent across California between 1994 and 1999. The figures are also disputed by Patrick Range McDonald and Professor Andrew Karmen, John Jay College of Criminal Justice. Karmen stated that, adjusting for population, the Los Angeles murder rate would need to be 180 or less to be equivalent to the crime rate of 1956, with its rate of 104 homicides per 2.2 million people, or one killing for every 22,115 people (the 2007 rate was 396 per 4 million people, or one killing per 10,101 people). McDonald further noted that, "In 1956, 89 percent of homicides were cleared. Today, if you kill another human being in Los Angeles, chances are very good you will get away with it: 43 out of every 100 killers are not caught." Similarly, he notes, "In 1956, 42 percent of robberies were cleared by an arrest. Today, that number is 26 percent."

Education

Villaraigosa sought to gain control of the Los Angeles Unified School District (LAUSD) as one of his top priorities as mayor, but instead was able to create the Partnership for Los Angeles Schools, a subset of LAUSD comprising the district's lowest-performing schools.

In his first State of the City address, he announced his intention to assume full control of the LAUSD, through a bill passed by the State Legislature. The school board and teachers' union immediately protested though there was support in the community from different areas in Los Angeles. He raised the issue of education as a critical part of solving economic disparity, providing the workforce for the future and articulated that "education is the civil rights issue of our time." Because LAUSD includes many other municipalities outside the city of Los Angeles, Villaraigosa wanted to engage all of the elected officials in those cities. He brought together union leaders and state legislators to create a Council of Mayors of the 28 cities served by LAUSD. The votes of each Mayor would be proportionate to the city's population.

The biggest issue during the Mayoral election of 2005 was public education. Because he campaigned and won on the issue of education, Villaraigosa sought the legal authority to do so through AB 1381. AB 1381 was passed by the state legislature and signed by Governor Arnold Schwarzenegger. However, the plan received significant opposition among the Los Angeles Board of Education, Board President Marlene Canter and then-superintendent of LAUSD, Roy Romer, among others. On December 21, 2006, AB 1381 was ruled unconstitutional.

In response, Villaraigosa founded a non-profit entity called the Mayor's Partnership for Los Angeles Schools to take control of the district's lowest-performing schools and transform them into high-performing schools. The Partnership eventually managed 21 LAUSD campuses, which operate under the same labor contract as LAUSD. Though schools in the Partnership were among the lowest performing in the district, they eventually made the largest gains in the state based on California's Annual Performance Index measure, and are now considered among the best performing urban schools in the state. The Partnership has generated some controversy since its founding. In June 2009, teachers at eight of the ten campuses cast a vote of "no confidence" in the Partnership. Villaraigosa continues to serve the Partnership by raising money in support of its success. The Partnership includes a program for parents called the "Partnership's Parent College." To date, over 10,000 of the Partnership's 16,000 parents have graduated from the Parent College.

In his final state of the City speech as Mayor of Los Angeles, Villaraigosa reiterated his commitment to education reform and expressed concern that the other Mayoral candidates did not share the same commitment to education in Los Angeles. "Education can't be a footnote on a campaign mailer or fodder for an attack ad," Villaraigosa said in his speech at UCLA's Royce Hall. "It's time for our candidates to demonstrate the 'fierce urgency of now' when it comes to ensuring that all of our children have access to great schools."

Animal services
In January 2005, Villaraigosa appeared before a coalition of animal rights activists and pledged that, if elected, he would implement a no-kill policy for Animal Services and fire General Manager Guerdon Stuckey, an appointee of former Mayor Hahn. Animal activists had expressed doubts regarding Stuckey's ability to lead the Department of Animal Service since his appointment, primarily citing his lack of experience. During Stuckey's tenure, activist concern intensified due to a refusal to accept charity-sponsored spay and neuter services, firings of several key animal rights-oriented workers, and excessive euthanasia of animals held by Animal Services. Approximately one year after Villaraigosa's initial promise to fire Stuckey and substantial negative press, Villaraigosa fired Stuckey. Stuckey appealed the firing to the City Council and threatened a lawsuit, and in February 2006, the Los Angeles City Council awarded Stuckey a $50,000 consulting fee with the agreement that there would be no lawsuit. In January 2006, Villaraigosa appointed Ed Boks to the General Manager position. In April 2009, Boks resigned after complaints from some staff, city councillors, and animal advocates. In June 2010, fifteen months after Boks' resignation, Brenda Barnette, former CEO of the Seattle Humane Society was appointed.

Taxes
Villaraigosa tripled the city's trash collection fee from $11 per month to $36.32 per month for single-family homes, stating: "Every new dollar residents pay for trash pickup will be used to put more officers on the streets," in a press release dated April 12, 2006. A 2008 L.A. City Controller audit by Laura Chick determined that 2008 "only $47 million, or about one-third of the new trash-fee revenue then pouring into city coffers, went to hiring police, and only 366 officers were hired instead of the promised 1,000."

Villaraigosa then lobbied to place Proposition S on the ballot to fund new police officers, concerned that a pending court ruling could eliminate the 40-year-old 10% telephone tax. This generated some controversy among tax activists, as Villaraigosa and his negotiating team had recently reached a salary agreement resulting in a 23% pay hike. Controller Laura Chick noted that Proposition S language does not restrict expenditure to police and firefighters, and instead deposits the money into the general fund. It is not certain that any of the Prop S monies were used to hire new police officers. Villaraigosa supports Proposition O, which currently adds $10.22 to the property tax bill of a $350,000 home and will eventually climb to $35.00. Villaraigosa also campaigned last fall for two education bond measures that will increase the size of property tax bills over the next decade.

On March 23, 2010, Villaraigosa, in a leaked memo warned the Los Angeles City Council that their potential failure to support a series of four proposed rate increases totaling 37% and already approved by the city's Department of Water and Power would be "the most immediate and direct route to bankruptcy the city could pursue".

Energy and the environment
In April 2008, Villaraigosa set aside a large parcel of industrial land around the Los Angeles River to create a "clean technology corridor." The project never materialized.

Villaraigosa played a critical role in establishing the LA Cleantech Incubator and voiced his support for the organization during the night of their opening.

Honorary degrees and awards
In February 2006, Villaraigosa was presented with the Tom Bradley Legacy Foundation Achievement Award for "following in the footsteps of the first African American Mayor of Los Angeles who served the city for 51 years." Citing the similarity of the two mayors in building coalitions among diverse communities, the speakers praised Villaraigosa for his vision for the City of Los Angeles. Also in attendance were Mrs. Ethel Bradley, daughter Lorraine and many of Mayor Bradley's former staff members.

On May 6, 2006, Villaraigosa was awarded an honorary degree by Loyola Marymount University, and was the Class of 2006 Commencement Speaker. On May 12, 2006, he was awarded a Doctor of Humane Letters by the University of Southern California and was the Class of 2006 commencement speaker. In June 2006, Villaraigosa received the Golden Plate Award of the American Academy of Achievement. In 2007, he was awarded an honorary Doctor of Humane Letters from Whittier College.

Villaraigosa was one of ten mayors from North America to be short-listed as a finalist for the 2008 World Mayor Award.

International publicity

In October 2006, Villaraigosa traveled to England and Asia for a sixteen-day trade mission. In England, he visited London and Manchester, at the invitation of then-Prime Minister Tony Blair, and spoke about Los Angeles' efforts regarding global warming, homeland security and emergency preparedness, and its bid for the 2016 Olympic Games. Prime Minister Blair had visited Mayor Villaraigosa a couple months prior to that in Los Angeles.

In 2006, Villaraigosa led a delegation of over 50 business leaders to China, South Korea, and Japan that secured $300 million in direct foreign investment. In Beijing, Villaraigosa opened a LA Inc. tourism office, in order to ensure a permanent welcome for the millions of Chinese tourists who will visit Los Angeles over the next decade. In Japan, Villaraigosa launched a See My LA advertising campaign in Tokyo-based Family Mart convenience stores throughout Japan, South Korea, Taiwan, and Thailand.

In February 2008, Villaraigosa welcomed Mexican President Felipe Calderón Hinojosa and members of the Mexican delegation to discuss trade opportunities and witness the signing of a Memorandum of Understanding (MOU) between the Mexico Business Council for Foreign Trade, Investment and Technology (COMCE) and the Los Angeles Area Chamber of Commerce.

Villaraigosa traveled to Israel in June 2008 to meet with experts in homeland security, counter-terrorism, and green technology. He also signed an agreement with the International Institute for Counter-Terrorism (ICT – part the Interdisciplinary Center in Herzliya) on behalf of the LA police department. Under the agreement, the ICT will train US homeland security officials. In recent years, he developed a relationship with the Mayor of the Israeli city of Sderot, Eli Moyal, and met with him during the visit. Villaraigosa has long retained strong ties to the Los Angeles Jewish Community, having spent part of his childhood in the once-Jewish dominated neighborhood of Boyle Heights.

Criticisms and controversies

In June 2009, Villaraigosa made the cover of Los Angeles Magazine, titled "Failure," with an accompanying article written by Ed Leibowitz, which claimed that Villaraigosa often confused campaigning with governance, wasted 22 weeks in his first term trying to take over the school board, and did little to help education in the City of Los Angeles.

In February 2010, La Opinion staffer Isaiah Alvarado noted that Villaraigosa's call for job and cuts in city departments did not include his own staff of 205 employees, compared to 121 staffers for Hahn and 114 for Riordan. Alvarado also noted that even after a 10% reduction, the Mayor's office spent $1.8 million more than Hahn in the last year of his administration and $1.4 million more than Riordan. This budget does not include the annual $118,000 covering of the Getty House, the official residence of the Mayor of Los Angeles.

Ethics violations
On May 2, 2007, the Los Angeles Times reported that Villaraigosa was under investigation for ethics violations: "The executive director of the Los Angeles Ethics Commission...accused Mayor Antonio Villaraigosa of 31 violations of campaign finance and disclosure laws stemming from his 2003 campaign for the City Council."

In June 2010, a formal ethics investigation of Villaraigosa was launched due to his unreported acceptance of 81 tickets to concerts, awards ceremonies and sporting events. Estimates—including the 13 Lakers courtside tickets valued at $3,100 each and Academy Awards and Governor's Ball tickets at $21,000 each—suggest that the value of the tickets could amount to tens of thousands of dollars.

2012 DNC controversy
At the 2012 Democratic National Convention, where Villaraigosa was chairman, the original 2012 party platform caused controversy after it was written, because of the lack of typical invocations and references to God and God-given rights, as well as lack of language affirming the role of Jerusalem as the capital of Israel. Both of these matters had been included in some previous platforms. On the second day, September 5, former Ohio Governor Ted Strickland introduced an amendment on the floor of the convention to re-insert language invoking God and recognizing Jerusalem as Israel's capital. Convention Chairman Villaraigosa put the amendment to a voice vote requiring a two-thirds majority for passage. After the first vote had greater volume of "nays", Villaraigosa called for a second vote, which was again met with greater volume of "nays" than "yays". A woman standing to his left said, "You've got to rule, and then you've got to let them do what they're gonna do." Villaraigosa called a third vote, with the same result. Despite not receiving a two-thirds majority, Villaraigosa still declared the amendment passed, causing an eruption of boos on the floor.

Herbalife advisor
In February 2015, while Villaraigosa was considering a run for the United States Senate, the Los Angeles Times reported on Villaraigosa's work as an advisor to controversial multi-level marketing dietary supplement company Herbalife Nutrition. The story questioned whether Villaraigosa's relationship with Herbalife would become a significant hurdle in a statewide run, given the company's checkered reputation and ongoing U.S. Federal Trade Commission investigations. Herbalife has been strongly criticized as being a pyramid scheme that specifically targets Hispanics.

Villaraigosa's role as a consultant to the embattled company was condemned by the League of United Latin American Citizens, an advocacy organization focused on Hispanic advancement.

Public opinion

After his election as Los Angeles Mayor, Villaraigosa was featured on the cover of Newsweek, and in Times story on the country's 25 most influential Latinos, but repeated questions concerning his marital infidelity issues appear to have damaged his reputation locally and nationally. His approval rating when he left office was 47%.

Villaraigosa has also received criticism because of his membership in MEChA while attending UCLA and his alleged support for immigration reform. He has also been criticized because of the high frequency in which he holds press conferences, attends photo-ops, and travels out of town (including campaigning for Hillary Clinton). An LA Weekly article by Patrick Range McDonald published on September 11, 2008, presented an analysis of a 10-week period from May 21 to August 1, and determined that "On direct city business—such as signing legislation and meeting with city-department heads—his schedule shows the mayor spent 11 percent of his time...Yet the 11 percent of Villaraigosa's time that the Weekly has identified as being spent in L.A. on actual city work—running, fixing or shaping government policies and actions—reveals that he frequently spends that limited time huddling with special-interest groups who have helped him attain higher office."

A November 4, 2008 election day poll, conducted by the Center for the Study of Los Angeles at Loyola Marymount University found that Villaraigosa had a job approval rating of 61%. In 2009, a poll by the Los Angeles times showed his approval rating had slipped to 55%, "relatively low for a sitting Mayor who faced little name opposition in his recent re-election victory." At the same time, his showing and that of the candidates he supported in the election were lackluster.

Villaraigosa was featured in the editorial cover story of the June 2009 Los Angeles Magazine, which took him to task for a lack of effectiveness regarding many of his stated policy priorities, and a focus on election to higher office, to the detriment of the needs of the city. In response, the Jewish Journal of Greater Los Angeles devoted its June 11 cover story to a defense of Villaraigosa's record.

After he left the mayor's office, Villaraigosa was involved in Campaign to Fix the Debt, a movement for entitlement reform to cut Social Security and Medicare, which Democratic strategist Nathan Ballard said is "not just touching the third rail — it's an act of public self-immolation."

Personal life
Villaraigosa's first of four children, Marisela Villar, was born when he was 21. His second child, Prisila Villar, was born four years later.

At age 34, as Antonio Villar, he married Corina Raigosa November 28, 1987, and adopted a combination of their last names as his family name. The couple had two children, Natalia and Antonio Jr. In the wake of his affair with Spanish-language television reporter Mirthala Salinas, Villaraigosa announced that he was separating from his wife, and on June 12, 2007, Corina Villaraigosa filed for dissolution of marriage in the Los Angeles Superior Court, citing irreconcilable differences. Villaraigosa acknowledged on July 3, 2007, that he was in a relationship with Salinas. As a result of the affair, Salinas was suspended by her employer, Telemundo, and against her will was relocated to Riverside, after which she resigned. In a New Yorker profile published shortly before the divorce, Villaraigosa acknowledged that he and Corina had had difficulties over the course of their marriage. "In a twenty-year marriage, there are many ups and downs", Villaraigosa said. The same article in The New Yorker also reported that, in 1994, while his wife had been battling thyroid cancer, Villaraigosa had become involved with the wife of a close friend. As a result, his wife filed for a divorce, and they were estranged for two and a half years.

Villaraigosa had a relationship with Lu Parker, a local television news anchor and 1994 Miss USA, in March 2009. In July 2012, Parker's publicist told the Los Angeles Times that the couple's relationship had ended on May 25, 2012.

Villaraigosa married Patricia Govea on August 6, 2016, in San Miguel de Allende, Mexico.

See also

 Los Angeles mayoral election, 2001
 Los Angeles mayoral election, 2005
 Los Angeles mayoral election, 2009

References

External links
 Campaign Website
 Antonio Villaraigosa Biography and Interview with American Academy of Achievement

Footnotes
  

 
 
 
  
 
 
 
 
 
 
 
 
 
 
 Office Of The Mayor Mayor Villaraigosa Fills A Major Milestone For The City's Pothole Repair Program, City Of Los Angeles, October 27, 2008 
 
  
 
 
 News From The City Controller Chick Finds Animal Services Ill-Prepared to Implement or Enforce New Mandatory Spay and Neuter Law, City Of Los Angeles, August 19, 2008

Further reading
 Bruck, Connie. "Fault Lines". The New Yorker, May 21, 2007, pp. 44–55.
 Ricks, Boris E. "Antonio Villaraigosa, Los Angeles, and the politics of race." in 21st Century Urban Race Politics: Representing Minorities as Universal Interests (Emerald, 2013) pp. 163-180.
 Sonenshein, Raphael J., and Susan H. Pinkus. "Latino incorporation reaches the urban summit: How Antonio Villaraigosa won the 2005 Los Angeles mayor's race." PS: Political Science & Politics 38.4 (2005): 713-721 online.

 Reaching across LA's ethnic divide, David Willis, BBC News Los Angeles (May 17, 2005).
 Villaraigosa: The Myth of The Progressive Mayor. LA Progressive (July 5, 2013)

External links

 

|-

|-

|-

}
|-

|-

1953 births
Living people
American Civil Liberties Union people
Mexican-American people in California politics
Barack Obama 2012 presidential campaign
Candidates in the 2018 United States elections
East Los Angeles College alumni
Hispanic and Latino American mayors in California
Hispanic and Latino American state legislators in California
Mayors of Los Angeles
People's College of Law alumni
Speakers of the California State Assembly
Democratic Party members of the California State Assembly
University of California, Los Angeles alumni
Presidents of the United States Conference of Mayors
People from Mount Washington, Los Angeles
Candidates in the 2001 United States elections